William Arthur McKeighan (January 19, 1842 – December 15, 1895) was an American politician.

McKeighan was born in Millville, New Jersey. He moved with his parents to Fulton County, Illinois, in 1848. He enlisted in the 11th Regiment Illinois Volunteer Cavalry, in September 1861, to fight in the Civil War. When the war ended he was stationed on a farm near Pontiac, Illinois. He decided to take up farming. He moved to Nebraska in 1880 and continued farming near Red Cloud, Nebraska.

McKeighan started to take interest in creating the Farmers' Alliance and was elected Probate Judge of Webster County from 1885 to 1887. He ran unsuccessfully for U.S. Representative in the 1888 election. He ran and won the 2nd district seat in 1890. Following the results of the 1890 census being apportioned, McKeighan ran for the newly created 5th district in 1892 and won again. He ran and lost for reelection in 1894, and died in Hastings, Nebraska, on December 15, 1895. He is interred in Red Cloud Cemetery, Red Cloud, Nebraska

References

External links

1842 births
1895 deaths
People from Millville, New Jersey
People's Party members of the United States House of Representatives from Nebraska
People from Red Cloud, Nebraska
19th-century American politicians
People from Fulton County, Illinois
People from Pontiac, Illinois
Nebraska Populists
Members of the United States House of Representatives from Nebraska